The 2019–20 Stony Brook Seawolves women's basketball team represent Stony Brook University during the 2019–20 NCAA Division I women's basketball season. The Seawolves, led by sixth-year head coach Caroline McCombs, play their home games at the Island Federal Credit Union Arena and are members in the America East Conference.

The season saw Stony Brook break program records for longest win streak, most wins under McCombs and most wins in program history. Stony Brook won the America East regular season championship for the first time in program history. On February 8, 2020, the Seawolves took over the longest winning streak in the country with 20 games after Gonzaga lost. Stony Brook had the longest winning streak in the country at 22 games until they lost to Maine on February 23.

Stony Brook earned the No. 1 seed in the America East tournament for the first time. Stony Brook advanced to the America East Championship for the third time and was set to take on Maine, but the game was canceled as a result to the COVID-19 pandemic. Stony Brook was named the America East tournament champion due to being the highest seed remaining.

Media 
All non-televised home games and conference road games will be streamed on ESPN3 or ESPN+.

Roster

Schedule 

|-
!colspan=9 style=| Non-conference regular season

|-
!colspan=9 style=| America East Conference regular season

|-
!colspan=9 style=| America East Women's Tournament

See also 
 2019–20 Stony Brook Seawolves men's basketball team

References 

Stony Brook Seawolves women's basketball seasons
Stony Brook Seawolves women's basketball team
Stony Brook Seawolves women's basketball team
Stony Brook Seawolves women's basketball team